Andrew Paisley Ormiston (1 March 1884 – 1952), also known as Alec Ormiston, was a Scottish footballer who made 139 appearances in the Football League playing for Lincoln City and Chelsea. He played as a centre half or left half.

Life and career
Ormiston was born in Peebles, Scotland. He played non-league football in England for Hebburn Argyle, before joining Football League Second Division club Lincoln City in 1907. The club finished bottom of the division in 1908, and failed to gain re-election to the League. Ormiston helped Lincoln win their second Midland League title in 1908–09, and then followed former Lincoln manager David Calderhead to First Division club Chelsea. He played just over 100 matches in senior competition over five years, and made a solid contribution to Chelsea's return to the First Division in 1912, but his career with the club effectively ended in April 1914 when he suffered a serious ankle injury in a match at Bradford City.

He guested for former club Lincoln during the war, and signed for them when competitive football resumed in 1919. On the opening day of the 1919–20 season, as Lincoln earned an unexpected draw against West Ham United, who were playing their first match after joining the Football League from the Southern League, Ormiston's experience made him stand out: He played his last game for Lincoln in December 1919, and returned to Scotland, where he appeared for Peebles Rovers.

Ormiston died 30 June 1952 in Peebles, Peeblesshire, Scotland.

Honours
Lincoln City
 Midland League: 1908–09
Chelsea
 Football League Second Division runners-up: 1911–12

Notes

References

1884 births
1952 deaths
People from Peebles
Scottish footballers
Association football defenders
Hebburn Argyle F.C. players
Lincoln City F.C. players
Chelsea F.C. players
Peebles Rovers F.C. players
English Football League players
Midland Football League players